The 2021 Leinster Senior Football Championship is the 2021 iteration of the Leinster Senior Football Championship organised by Leinster GAA.

Teams
The Leinster championship was contested by 11 of the 12 county teams in Leinster, a province of Ireland. Kilkenny was the only county team not to compete.

Championship draw
The draw for the preliminary rounds and quarter-finals took place on 20 April 2021. The draw for the semi-finals took place on 4 July 2021, after the completion of the quarter-final ties.

Preliminary round

Quarter-finals

Semi-finals

Final

Dublin advanced to the 2021 All-Ireland SFC semi-finals.

See also
 2021 All-Ireland Senior Football Championship
 2021 Connacht Senior Football Championship
 2021 Munster Senior Football Championship
 2021 Ulster Senior Football Championship

References

External links
 Leinster GAA | The Official Website of Leinster GAA

2L
Leinster Championship
Leinster Senior Football Championship